Pavel Kučera (11 February 1940 – 23 July 2019) was a Czech lawyer and judge who served as vice president of the Supreme Court of the Czech Republic.

References

1940 births
2019 deaths
Supreme Court of the Czech Republic judges
Judges from Prague